Christopher Ian Timms (24 March 1947 – 19 March 2004) was a yachtsman from New Zealand. He won a gold medal at the 1984 Summer Olympics in Los Angeles, and a silver medal at the 1988 Summer Olympics in Seoul. Timms died in 2004 when the aircraft he was flying in crashed into the Firth of Thames.

References

External links
 
 
 

1947 births
2004 deaths
New Zealand male sailors (sport)
Sailors at the 1984 Summer Olympics – Tornado
Sailors at the 1988 Summer Olympics – Tornado
Olympic gold medalists for New Zealand in sailing
Olympic silver medalists for New Zealand
Sportspeople from Christchurch
Victims of aviation accidents or incidents in New Zealand
Medalists at the 1988 Summer Olympics
Medalists at the 1984 Summer Olympics
Victims of aviation accidents or incidents in 2004